Joseph Asquini (c. 1925 – April 9, 1990) was a Canadian football player who played for the Ottawa Rough Riders. He won the Grey Cup with them in 1951.

References

1925 births
1990 deaths
Canadian football people from Ottawa
Players of Canadian football from Ontario
Ottawa Rough Riders players